Atul Gurtu (born 16 January 1946) is a high energy physicist in India. He joined the Tata Institute of Fundamental Research (TIFR), Mumbai, in 1971, and retired in 2011 as a senior professor, after a career spanning four decades in particle physics research.

Early life
Gurtu was born in Lahore in 1946. In 1947, he moved to India. He studied at Auckland House, Shimla, and later at the Lawrence School Sanawar. He attended Panjab University, Chandigarh, and thereafter joined the TIFR in 1969.

Career
Gurtu is a particle physics researcher. He participated in numerous experimental projects in collaboration with CERN, Geneva, from 1969 to 2011, as part of high energy physics group at TIFR. From 2003 to 2011, he led a 70-member Indian team which participated in CERN experiment of first proton run at the Large Hadron Collider, known as "mini Big Bang". From 2011-12 he was Distinguished Professor at the King Abdulaziz University, Jeddah, Saudi Arabia. Currently (from March 2018) he is Eminent Scholar at Kyung Hee University, South Korea.

Personal life
He married Promila Bawa in 1971. In 1974, they had their first (and only) child Ashish, who was differently abled and died in 1991. His wife died in 2006. In January 2011, he married National Film Award winning actress Suhasini Mulay, whom he met on Facebook.

References

External links
 
 Atul Gurtu on Indian Academy of Sciences
 Scientific publications of Atul Gurtu on INSPIRE-HEP
 

20th-century Indian physicists
1946 births
Living people
Indian particle physicists
Lawrence School, Sanawar alumni
Tata Institute of Fundamental Research alumni
Academic staff of Tata Institute of Fundamental Research
Academic staff of King Abdulaziz University
People associated with CERN
Panjab University alumni
Scientists from Lahore